Steve Norn is a former Canadian politician, who was elected to the Legislative Assembly of the Northwest Territories in the 2019 election. He represented the electoral district of Tu Nedhé-Wiilideh.

Prior to his election to the legislature, Norn worked as a Royal Canadian Mounted Police officer and as an insurance broker, and competed on Canada's Smartest Person in 2016.

On November 23, 2021 Steve Norn was expelled from the Legislative Assembly. This was the culmination of a nearly year long saga months after Norn breached territorial COVID-19 protocols. The public backlash to Norn was intense, and Norn responded by levelling lawsuits against local journalists for allegedly stoking public outrage, contributing to northern news outlets barring public comments on articles due to racist and violent attacks against him. He was eventually charged with two counts of violating the public health act. The ensuing investigations mandated by the Legislative Assembly were marred with leaks and obstruction on behalf of Norn, who ultimately began to lash out verbally and electronically towards his elected colleagues. In late 2021, the ensuing inquiry on his behavior determined that Norn had purposefully misled the public and broke the Legislative Assembly code of conduct on multiple occasions. Justice Ronald Barclay recommended that his seat be declared vacant. Norn ignored the report and recommendations, but MLA Freida Martselos requested a vote on his expulsion as soon as the Legislative Assembly returned for the last session of the year. Upon reconvening, the Legislature unanimously voted to expel Norn. Norn was not present for this vote; he attempted to resign just minutes prior to the vote taking place, but this was rejected by the Speaker. This was the first time in Northwest Territories history that members of the legislature removed a colleague.

References 

Living people
Members of the Legislative Assembly of the Northwest Territories
21st-century Canadian politicians
Year of birth missing (living people)
Participants in Canadian reality television series